Scutellaria minor, the lesser skullcap, is a species of flowering plant in the family Lamiaceae.

Description

Distribution and habitat
Scutellaria minor has a southern temperate distribution in Europe. It grows in wet heaths and open woodland on acidic soils. In the British Isles, it is restricted to southern and western areas, extending as far north as the Outer Hebrides.

Taxonomy
Scutellaria minor was first described in 1762 by William Hudson in his Flora Anglica. Hybrids with S. galericulata, known as Scutellaria × hybrida, sometimes occur where both parent species co-occur.

References

External links

Distribution of S. minor in the British Isles, Botanical Society of the British Isles
Scutellaria minor, West Highland Flora

minor
Flora of Europe
Plants described in 1762
Taxa named by William Hudson (botanist)